Linha de Sines is a railway line which connects the station of Ermidas-Sado, on the Linha do Sul, to the Port of Sines, in Portugal. It used to be connected to the station of Sines via a branch line. The first section, from Ermidas-Sado to São Bartolomeu da Serra was opened on 9 April 1927. The line reached Cumeadas on 1 July 1929, Santiago do Cacém on 20 June 1934, and Sines on 14 September 1936.

See also 
 List of railway lines in Portugal
 History of rail transport in Portugal

References

Sources
 

Railway lines in Portugal
Iberian gauge railways
Railway lines opened in 1927